Andrea Tóth (born 7 August 1981) is a female water polo player from Hungary, who competed for her native country at the 2004 Summer Olympics in Athens, Greece.

Tóth played for VF Kecskemét, BVSC, Dunaujváros, Volturno Italy and Szentes.

See also
 Hungary women's Olympic water polo team records and statistics
 List of women's Olympic water polo tournament goalkeepers
 List of world champions in women's water polo
 List of World Aquatics Championships medalists in water polo
 Magyar női vízilabda-válogatott

External links
 

https://www.nemzetisport.hu/vizilabda/20050828/toth_volturnoba_szerzodik/?oldal=1

1981 births
Living people
People from Kecskemét
Hungarian female water polo players
Water polo goalkeepers
Olympic water polo players of Hungary
Water polo players at the 2004 Summer Olympics
World Aquatics Championships medalists in water polo
Sportspeople from Bács-Kiskun County
20th-century Hungarian women
21st-century Hungarian women